Kuruna is a genus of flowering plants belonging to the family Poaceae.

Its native range is Southern India, Sri Lanka.

Species:

Kuruna debilis 
Kuruna densifolia 
Kuruna floribunda 
Kuruna scandens 
Kuruna serrulata 
Kuruna walkeriana 
Kuruna wightiana

References

Bambusoideae
Bambusoideae genera